Robert W. Hamilton may refer to:

 Robert Wilson Hamilton (1819–1904), American-born lawyer and judge in Fiji
 Sir Robert Hamilton (Liberal politician) (Robert William Hamilton, 1867–1944), Scottish Member of Parliament for Orkney and Shetland
 Robert W. Hamilton (judge) (1899–1981), Justice of the Texas Supreme Court
 Robert Hamilton (archaeologist) (Robert William Hamilton, 1905–1995), British archaeologist and academic
 Robert William Hamilton Jr. (1930–2011), hyperbaric physiologist
 Robert W. Hamilton (law professor) (1931–2018), American law professor
 Robert W. Hamilton Book Award, a writing award named for the professor

 Robert W. Hamilton House, a historic house built in Murphysboro, Illinois, in 1867

See also
 Robert Hamilton (disambiguation)